Cole Alexander Swider (born May 8, 1999) is an American professional basketball player for the Los Angeles Lakers of the National Basketball Association (NBA), on a two-way contract with the South Bay Lakers of the NBA G League. He played college basketball for the Villanova Wildcats and the Syracuse Orange.

Early life and high school career
Swider grew up in Portsmouth, Rhode Island and attended the St. Andrew's School. Swider was named the Rhode Island Gatorade Player of the Year as a junior after averaging 26.5 points, 11.2 rebounds, 3.1 assists, 1.9 steals, and 1.3 blocks per game. He averaged 31 points per game in his senior season. Swider was rated a four-star recruit and committed to play college basketball at Villanova over offers from Syracuse, Xavier, and Duke.

College career
Swider began his collegiate career at Villanova. He played in 31 games and started 15 during his sophomore season and averaged 6.1 points and 2.9 rebounds. As a junior, he played in all 25 of Villanova's games and averaged 5.7 points and 2.8 rebounds per game. After the season, Swider entered the NCAA transfer portal.

Swider ultimately transferred to Syracuse. He became the Orange's starting power forward and averaged 13.9 points, 6.8 rebounds, and 1.8 assists per game. Following the end of the season, Swider announced that he would be entering the 2022 NBA draft and hiring an agent.

Professional career

Los Angeles Lakers (2022–present)
After going unselected in the 2022 NBA draft, Swider signed a two-way contract with the Los Angeles Lakers on July 1, 2022, splitting time with their G League affiliate, the South Bay Lakers. Swider joined the Lakers' 2022 NBA Summer League roster. In his Summer League debut, Swider scored thirteen points, six rebounds, and a block in a 100–66 win against the Miami Heat.

References

External links
Villanova Wildcats bio
Syracuse Orange bio

1999 births
Living people
American men's basketball players
Basketball players from Rhode Island
Los Angeles Lakers players
People from Portsmouth, Rhode Island
Power forwards (basketball)
South Bay Lakers players
Syracuse Orange men's basketball players
Undrafted National Basketball Association players
Villanova Wildcats men's basketball players